Mansour Barzegar (born 28 February 1947) is a retired Iranian welterweight freestyle wrestler. He competed at the 1972 and 1976 Olympics and placed fifth and second, respectively. At the world championships he won one gold and two silver medals between 1973 and 1977.

Barzegar was born as the fifth boy in a large sporting family, he also had one sister. He lost his father at the age of 6, and was included into the national wrestling team aged 24. He was seriously injured in the final of the 1975 World Championships, when he lost to his long-time rival Ruslan Ashuraliyev, but recovered by the 1976 Olympics to win another silver medal. Barzegar retired from competitions at the 1979 World Championships and then had a long career as a national wrestling coach.

References

External links
 

Sportspeople from Tehran
Olympic wrestlers of Iran
Wrestlers at the 1972 Summer Olympics
Wrestlers at the 1976 Summer Olympics
Iranian male sport wrestlers
Olympic silver medalists for Iran
Medalists at the 1976 Summer Olympics
Living people
Asian Games gold medalists for Iran
Asian Games medalists in wrestling
Wrestlers at the 1974 Asian Games
World Wrestling Championships medalists
Medalists at the 1974 Asian Games
1947 births
20th-century Iranian people
21st-century Iranian people
World Wrestling Champions